"Whisper My Name" is a song written by Trey Bruce, and recorded by American country music artist Randy Travis.  It was released in June 1994 as the second single from his album This Is Me.  It became a Number One country hit for him in both the United States and Canada.

Critical reception
Thom Jurek of Allmusic cited the song as a standout track in his review of the album, saying it was "among the greatest songs Travis has ever recorded. The backing vocals by Suzy Ragsdale, Darrell Scott, and Verlon Thompson set the tune apart and accent what a grateful love song this is."

Chart performance
"Whisper My Name" debuted at number 67 on the U.S. Billboard Hot Country Singles & Tracks for the week of June 11, 1994.

Year-end charts

References

1994 singles
Randy Travis songs
Songs written by Trey Bruce
Song recordings produced by Kyle Lehning
Warner Records Nashville singles
1994 songs